Criminal psychology, also referred to as criminological psychology, is the study of the views, thoughts, intentions, actions and reactions of criminals and suspects. It is a subfield of criminology and applied psychology.

Criminal psychologists have many roles within legal courts, including being called upon as expert witnesses and performing psychological assessments. Some types of psychiatry behaviour  with aspects of criminal behaviour. Several definitions are used for criminal behaviour, including behaviour punishable by public law, behaviour considered immoral, behaviour violating social norms or traditions, or acts causing severe psychological harm. Criminal behaviour is often considered antisocial in nature.They also help with crime prevention and study the different types of programs that are effective or not effective.

History 
Criminal psychology started the late 18th century. There were four key aspects of the development of criminal psychology: philosophical, medical, legal and biological. Before criminal psychology, there was a conflict in criminal law between medical experts and court judges on determining how to proceed with a majority of cases which specialized ated the development of a specialized sed field for individual investigations and assessments of suspects. It is generally accepted that criminal psychology was a predecessor to the broader field of criminology, which includes other fields such as criminal anthropology which studies more systemic aspects of crime as opposed to individual suspects and court cases.

Profiling 

Criminal profiling, also known as offender profiling, is a form of criminal investigation, linking an offender's actions at the crime scene to possible characteristics. This is a practice that lies between the professions of criminology, forensic science and behavioural science. Most commonly used for homicide and sexual cases, criminal profiling helps law enforcement investigators narrow down and prioritize a pool of suspects. Part of a sub-field of forensic psychology called investigative psychology, criminal profiling has advanced substantially in methodology and grown in popularity since its conception in the late 1800s. However, there is a substantial lack of empirical research and effectiveness evaluations validating the practice of criminal profiling. Due to the lack of empirical research, it is important that criminal profiling is used as a tool in investigative cases. Cases should not depend on solely the profile but as well as traditional techniques as well. 

Criminal profiling is a process now known in the Federal Bureau of Investigation (FBI) as criminal investigative analysis. (see also: FBI method of profiling) Profilers, or criminal investigative analysts, are trained and experienced law enforcement officers who study every behavioural aspect and detail of an unsolved violent crime scene, in which a certain amount of psychopathology has been left at the scene. The characteristics of a good profiler are discussed. Five behavioural characteristics that can be gleaned from the crime scene are described:

 amount of premeditation,
 degree of control used by the offender,
 escalation of emotion at the scene,
 risk level of both the offender and victim, and
 appearance of the crime scene (disorganized versus organized).

The process of interpreting the behaviour observed at a crime scene is briefly discussed.

In a 2017 article by Pew research center, it was found that federal and state prisons in the United States held 475,900 inmates who were black and 436,500 who were white. Similar historical data supports the substantially higher incarceration of black people. This is in contrast with census data which has placed the percentage of black people or African American people at about 12% of the US population. Negative ethnic stereotypes contribute to this disproportionate incarceration; it has served as a justification for the unofficial policies and practices of racial profiling by criminal justice practitioners.

The cultural, environmental and traditional concepts of communities play a major role in individual psychology, providing profilers with a potential basis for behavioural patterns learned by offenders during their upbringing. They also evaluate the safety of prisons for those incarcerated, as some individuals may be predisposed to recidivism if the prisoners' mental health is not adequately addressed. There are many individual factors contributing to developing a criminal profile that both meets legal requirements and treats profiled individuals humanely.

Consultation 
Criminal psychologists will often use their expertise of human behaviour to consult with law enforcement personnel and others in the criminal justice system on various aspects of a case. they can help them ask appropriate questions during interrogation or give relevant information to help guide investigation.

Crime Prevention 
There are several programs that attempt to help teens and young adults that are having disciplinary problems and involvement with the law. These programs include Scared Straight, Boot Camps, and rehabilitation. Research shows that these programs are ineffective or that they may even increase the likelihood of participants reoffending.In order for these interventions to be effective the person needs to voluntarily accept treatment. Research has shown that the most effective methods for preventing recidivism are Cognitive Behavior Therapy (CBT)

Career paths 
A bachelor's degree in psychology or criminal justice as well as a master's degree in a related field are needed in order to pursue a career in criminal psychology. A doctorate, either a Ph.D. or a Psy.D, typically yields higher pay and more lucrative job opportunities. In addition to degrees, a licensing exam is required by state or jurisdiction.

Criminal profilers require a master's degree or a doctorate, several years of experience and in some cases passing state examinations to become a licensed psychologist.

Criminal profilers can work in various settings including offices and courtrooms and can be employed at a number of institutions. Some include local, state, or federal government, and others can be self-employed as independent consultants. , the average amount of a criminal psychologist is $58,246 and can increase to $95,000. Several factors contribute to how much a person makes within the field, including how much time a person has worked within the field, and the city with which a person works in. Criminal psychologists who work within larger cities tend to make more than psychologists who work in lower populated cities. Those who work for hospitals or federal government tend to have a lower salary. Some of the top paying states for forensic psychologists are New Hampshire, Washington, New York, Massachusetts, and California.

Forensic psychology careers include:

 Correctional counsellor
 Jail supervisor
 Victim advocate
 Jury consultant
 Forensic social worker
 Expert witness
 Forensic psychology professor
 Forensic psychology researcher
 Forensic case manager
 Criminal profiler
 Forensic psychologist
 Correctional psychologist

Comparison to forensics

The effect of psychosocial factors on brain functioning and behaviour is a central part of analysis for both forensic and criminal psychologists, under the category of applied psychology. For forensic psychiatry, major areas of criminal evaluations include assessing the ability of an individual to stand trial, providing an opinion on what the mental state of the individual was at the time of offence risk management for future offences (recidivism), providing treatment to criminals including medication and psychotherapy, and being an expert witness. This process often involves psychological testing. Forensic psychologists have similar roles to forensic psychiatrists, although are unable to prescribe medication. Criminal psychologists focus on research, profiling, and educating/assisting law enforcement with the detainment of suspects.

Criminal and forensic psychologists may also consider the following factors:

The current presence of mental disorders
The level of accountability or responsibility an individual has for a crime due to mental disorders
Likelihood of recidivism and involved risk factors
Epidemiology of related mental disorders under consideration
The motivation behind why a crime was committed.
Criminal psychology is also related to legal psychology, forensic psychology and crime investigations.

The question of competency to stand trial is to question of an offender's current state of mind. This assesses the offender's ability to understand the charges against them, the possible outcomes of being convicted/acquitted of these charges and their ability to assist their attorney with their defence. The question of sanity/insanity or criminal responsibility is an assessment of the offender's state of mind at the time of the crime. This refers to their ability to understand right from wrong and what is illegal. The insanity defence is rarely used, as it is very difficult to prove. If declared insane, an offender may be committed to a secure hospital facility, potentially for much longer than they would have served in prison.

Key studies
A number of key studies of psychology especially relevant to understanding criminal psychology have been undertaken. These include:

 Bobo doll experiment (Bandura, Ross & Ross 1961)
 The Stanford prison experiment (Philip Zimbardo 1973)
 Eyewitness study (Loftus, Palmer 1974)
 Studies On Criminological Psychology (Dr. Navinta Rani 1950)

See also
 Forensic psychology
 Moral psychology
 Criminal anthropology
 Antisocial personality disorder
 Psychopathy
 Malignant narcissism
 Sadistic personality disorder

References

 David Canter (2008) Criminal Psychology London: Hodder Education

 
1876 establishments in Italy
Italian inventions
Criminology